Maria Bodén (born 3 January 1978) is a Swedish professional golfer who played on the Ladies European Tour between 2002 and 2010. She won the 2005 South African Women's Open and was runner-up at the 2008 Ladies Scottish Open.

Career
As an amateur, Bodén was Swedish Junior National champion twice, and a member of the Swedish national team 1995–2000, representing her country in two World Amateur Team Championships, the 1998 and 2000 Espirito Santo Trophy, finishing fourth at the latter.

Bodén played golf at Oklahoma State where she qualified individually for the NCAA Women's Golf Championship three years running. A first-team All-American in 1999 and 2000, and three times Big-12 player of the year, she joined a group of only eight Cowgirls to earn at least three All-Big 12 selections, including Linnea Johansson, Caroline Hedwall, Pernilla Lindberg, Karin Sjödin and Linda Wessberg. Graduating with a degree in Anatomy and Physiology she was an Academic All-American, Oklahoma State Sportswoman of the Year in 2001, and won eight times representing her school.

Bodén turned professional in 2001 and won the Telia Tour Order of Merit, before joining the Ladies European Tour where she finished third at the 2002 Ladies Irish Open, one stroke away from a playoff with Iben Tinning and Suzann Pettersen. She was the Swedish Matchplay champion in 2004 and the following year won the South African Women's Open by a convincing seven shots at the Royal Johannesburg & Kensington Golf Club.

Bodén's seventh LET season in 2008 was her most successful, she posted three top-10s and finished 32nd on the money list. Her best career finish was at the 2008 Ladies Scottish Open, where she shared the lead  with Gwladys Nocera after the first round and finished runner-up. She was forced to retire early from tour in 2011 due to injury.

Amateur wins
1998 Swedish Junior Matchplay Championship
1999 Swedish Junior Matchplay Championship

Professional wins (8)

Sunshine Ladies Tour (1)
2005 Acer SA Women's Open

Swedish Golf Tour (7)
2001 (2) Albatross Ladies Open, Skandia PGA Open
2003 (2) Rejmes Ladies Open, Gefle Ladies Open 
2004 (2) SM Match, Swedish International 
2011 (1) Helsingborg Ladies Open

Team appearances
Amateur
 European Ladies' Team Championship (representing Sweden): 1999
Espirito Santo Trophy (representing Sweden): 1998, 2000

References

External links

Swedish female golfers
Ladies European Tour golfers
Oklahoma State Cowgirls golfers
Sportspeople from Västernorrland County
People from Härnösand
1978 births
Living people